Takah Chi (also Romanized as Takah Chī; also known as Takchī) is a village in Savalan Rural District, in the Central District of Parsabad County, Ardabil Province, Iran. At the 2006 census, its population was 962, in 186 families.

References 

Towns and villages in Parsabad County